Barbara Bray (née Jacobs; 24 November 1924 –  25 February 2010) was an English translator and critic.

Early life
Bray was born in Maida Vale, London; her parents had Belgian and Jewish origins. An identical twin (her sister Olive Classe was also a translator), she was educated at Girton College, Cambridge, where she read English, with papers in French and Italian and gained a  First. She married John Bray, an Australian-born RAF pilot, after the couple graduated from Cambridge, and had two daughters, Francesca and Julia. In 1958, Bray's husband died in an accident in Cyprus.

Career
Bray became a script editor in 1953 for the BBC Third Programme, commissioning and translating European 20th-century avant-garde writing for the network. Harold Pinter wrote some of his earliest work at Bray's insistence.

From about 1961, Bray lived in Paris and established a career as a translator and critic. She translated the correspondence of George Sand, and work by leading French-speaking writers of her own time including Marguerite Duras, Amin Maalouf, Julia Kristeva, Michel Quint, Jean Anouilh, Michel Tournier, Jean Genet, Alain Bosquet, Réjean Ducharme and Philippe Sollers. She received the PEN Translation Prize in 1986.

Bray collaborated with the film director Joseph Losey on the screenplay for Galileo (1975), which was an adaptation of the play by Bertolt Brecht. During the same decade, they collaborated on the script for a biographical film about Ibn Sa'ud, the founder of Saudi Arabia and (with Harold Pinter), she wrote an adaptation of Proust's Remembrance of Things Past.

Bray also worked extensively with Samuel Beckett, developing a professional as well as personal relationship that continued for the rest of his life. Bray was one of the few people with whom the playwright discussed his work.

Bray suffered a stroke at the end of 2003. In late 2009, she moved to a nursing home in Edinburgh near the residence of Francesca, one of her daughters.

In spite of her serious disability she worked until shortly before her death on her memoir of Samuel Beckett, Let Mortals Rejoice..., which she was unable to complete. Her reflections on Samuel Beckett, both as a writer and as a person, became part of a series of conversations with her Polish friend Marek Kedzierski, recorded from 2004 to 2009. Extensive excerpts from these conversations were published in German by Berlin's quarterly Lettre international (Es war wie ein Blitz… vol. 87, Winter 2009) and in French by the magazine Europe (C´était comme un éclair, un éclair aveuglant, no. 974/975 Juin-Juillet 2010), as well as in Polish, Slovak and Swedish. The English original of these excerpts remains unpublished, but other fragments have appeared in Modernism/modernity (Barbara Bray: In Her Own Words, Volume 18, Number 4, November 2011).

References

External links

1924 births
2010 deaths
20th-century English translators
20th-century English women writers
20th-century English non-fiction writers
Alumni of Girton College, Cambridge
British identical twins
People from Maida Vale
English critics
English translators
French–English translators
English women non-fiction writers
Literary translators
English people of Belgian descent